(Foochow Romanized: Kŭ-chèng Gâing) is a county lying in the northeastern Fujian province, People's Republic of China. It is under the administration of Ningde City and is located in the southwest part of the municipality. It is also known as "the town of the former worthy", as Zhu Xi, a famous Chinese scholar once lived there. It is also known as Kutien or Kucheng.

Area: 
Population: 429,463

History
The county was set up in the Tang Dynasty by Liujiang in 741 AD. Since Zhuxi, one of the famous scholars in China, lived there, it is also called "the town of the former worthy."

In 1895 the county was the site of a massacre of Christian missionaries.

Geography

Climate

Scenic Areas
There are a number of scenic areas in Gutian.
 The thousand-year-old Auspicious Tower.
 The Xishan Academy of Classical Learning, where Zhuxi once taught.
 The Linshui Palace.
 The Temple of Paradise.
 The Green Screen Lake.

Subdivision
Gutian has jurisdiction over 8 towns and 7 villages. It has a total population of 430,000.

Shanyang Town
Hetang town
Daqiao Town
Pinghu Town
Xincheng Town
Huangtian Town
Fengdu Town
Shuikou Town
Dajia Village
Zhuoyang Village
Jixiang Village
Songji Village
Hubin Village
Panyang Village
Fengpu Village

Agriculture
Gutian county is known as "The Land of Fungi". Fungal exports include snow fungus (Tremella fuciformis) and shiitake (Lentinula edodes). Other exports include perch, carp, honey peaches, reddish slab stones and Younai plums.

Communications and public works
Gutian's transportation systems include railways, highways and seaways. Waifu Railway is long. Abundant water resources have led to the building of the first national underground hydropower station, Gutian Xishui Hydroelectric Power Station, which has the largest volume in East China.

Miscellaneous
Gutian is the original home of many countrymen residing abroad. The number of overseas Chinese from this area amounts to more than 200,000, many now resident in Sitiawan, Perak in Malaysia. It is also a "national model county", which is famous for its culture, physical education and broadcasting TV programs.

See also
 Kucheng Massacre

References

 
County-level divisions of Fujian
Ningde